The University of Florida College of Agricultural and Life Sciences (CALS), founded in 1964, is a college of the University of Florida.

Overview
The programs offered specialize in agriculture, natural resources, and life sciences. CALS has two schools with it:

The School of Forest Resources and Conservation (forestry and conservation) and the School of Natural Resources and Environment (natural resources and environmental science).

CALS has 24 undergraduate majors, more than 50 areas of specialization and 20 graduate programs, CALS is an educational leader in the areas of food, agriculture, natural resources and life sciences.

Institute of Food and Agricultural Sciences
CALS administers the degree programs of the University of Florida's Institute of Food and Agricultural Sciences (IFAS).  IFAS is a federal, state, and local government partnership dedicated to develop knowledge in agriculture, human and natural resources, and the life sciences and to make that knowledge accessible to sustain and enhance the quality of human life. IFAS was awarded $166 million in annual research expenditures in sponsored research for 2018.

Florida Department of Citrus
The Florida Department of Citrus has its department of economic research at 2125 McCarty Hall.

Departments & Schools

 Agricultural and Biological Engineering
 Agricultural Education and Communication
 Agronomy
 Animal Sciences
 Entomology and Nematology
 Environmental Horticulture
 Family, Youth and Community Sciences
 Food and Resource Economics
 Food Science and Human Nutrition
 Horticultural Sciences
 Microbiology and Cell Science
 Plant Pathology
 School of Forest Resources and Conservation
 School of Natural Resources and Environment
 Soil and Water Science
 Wildlife Ecology and Conservation

References

External links
Official website
Info about the College
Website for IFAS
Overview of the College
Capital Campaign for the College
Anniversary Info
Alligator article about CALS

Agricultural and Life Sciences
1964 establishments in Florida
Florida